Alex Garcia-Rivera is an American rock drummer, drum-tech and recording engineer from Boston, Massachusetts. He has been the drummer for the bands Shelter, Piebald, Good Clean Fun, Bloodhorse, 454 Big Block, Saves The Day, Cold Cave, but is best known as the drummer for hardcore/punk band American Nightmare. He also performs all instruments in a solo band under the moniker Chrome Over Brass  and owns and operates Mystic Valley Studio, an all-analog recording studio in Medford, Massachusetts.

Touring band member
Alex Garcia-Rivera has been a touring drummer for the bands Shelter, Better Than A Thousand, Saves The Day, Piebald, Avoid One Thing, and Cold Cave.

Discography

American Nightmare
 American Nightmare (2018, Rise Records)
 We're Down Til We're Underground (2003, Equal Vision Records)

Chrome Over Brass
 16 Tracks of Feedback (EP) (2013)
 "Stukas in the Wind" (single) (2014)
 "Teenage Depression" (single) (2015)
 Chrome Over Brass (2015)
 Soulstice (single) (2016)

Ascend/Descend
 Murdock Street (2016)
 Molt (single) (2017)

Kingpin
 Holding Tomorrow (EP) (1991, Suburban Voice)

454 Big Block
 Save Me from Myself (1998, Big Wheel Recreation)

Get High
 Get High (1999, Big Wheel Recreation)
 II (1999, self-released)

Piebald
 The Rock Revolution Will Not Be Televised (2000, Big Wheel Recreation)
 Barely Legal/All Ages (2001, Big Wheel Recreation)

Good Clean Fun
 Straight Outta Hardcore (2001, Phyte/Reflections/Defiance)

Never Surrender
 Never Surrender (EP) (2003, Fight Fire with Fire)

Face the Enemy
 These Two Words (2003, Defiance)

Give Up the Ghost
 We're Down Til We're Underground (2003, Equal Vision)

Bloodhorse
 Black Lung Rising (2006, self-released)
 Bloodhorse (EP) (2007, Translation Loss)
 Horizoner (2009, Translation Loss)

Confessions
 Your Girl (EP) (2013, Vanya)

As drum technician
 Mutoid Man - War Moans - Sargent House
 Four Year Strong - Four Year Strong - Pure Noise Records
 Jejune – This Afternoons Malady – Big Wheel Recreation
 Madball – Look My Way – Roadrunner Records
 In My Eyes – Nothing To Hide – Revelation Records
 Converge – No Heroes – Epitaph Records
 Converge – Axe to Fall – Epitaph Records
 Converge – All We Love We Leave Behind – Epitaph Records
 Converge - The Dusk In Us - Epitaph Records, Deathwish Inc.
 The Hope Conspiracy – Death Knows Your Name – Deathwish Inc.
 Coliseum – No Salvation – Relapse Records
 Animosity – Animal – Metal Blade Records
 Piebald – Accidental Gentleman – SideOneDummy Records
 Clouds – We Are Above You – Hydra Head Records
 Cruel Hand – Prying Eyes – Bridge 9 Records
 Blacklisted – Heavier Than Heaven, Lonelier Than God – Deathwish Inc.
 Energy – Invasions of the Mind – Bridge 9 Records
 Soul Control – Cycles – Bridge 9 Records
 Verse – Aggression – Rivalry Records.    
 Dead Swans – Sleepwalkers – Bridge 9 Records
 High on Fire – De Vermis Mysteriis – E1 Music
 High On Fire - Luminiferous - Entertainment One Music
 Beastmilk – Climax
 Vallenfyre – Splinters
 Mountain Man - "TWO" - No Sleep Records

As recording engineer/producer
 American Nightmare (band) - American Nightmare - Rise Records
 Vundabar - Gawk
 Ascend/Descend - Murdock Street - Dead Tank Records
 Bloodhorse – EP – Translation Loss
 Bloodhorse – Horizoner – Translation Loss
 108 – 18.61 – Deathwish Inc.
 Covey - Haggarty
 Draize – Draize – Punks Before Profits 
 One Happy Island – Split 7" – Thee Sheffield Phonographic Corporation
 Mountain Man – Grief – Think Fast! Records
 Cerce – Cerce – It's A Trap! Records / Solidarity Recordings
 Native Wildlife – A Simple Life, A Quiet Mind
 Obsidian Tongue – Volume I: Subradiant Architecture 
 Obsidian Tongue – A Nest of Ravens in the Throat of Time – Hypnotic Dirge Records
 Lovechild – Demonstration
 No Flowers – EP One
 No Flowers – EP Two
 No Flowers – EP Three
 Dave Austin and the Sound – The Revival
 Wormwood – Wormwood
 CAZADOR —  Broken Sun
 Covey - Haggarty
 The Oracle - Book I - End Result Productions

References

External links 
 Chrome Over Brass on Facebook
 Chrome Over Brass on Bandcamp
 Mystic Valley Studio

Year of birth missing (living people)
Living people
American rock drummers
Deathwish Inc. artists
454 Big Block members
Saves the Day members